Saleban Olad Roble (died February 12, 2010) was a Somali politician and a minister in the Transitional Federal Government.

He was critically wounded in a suicide bombing at the Hotel Shamo in Mogadishu, the capital of Somalia, on 3 December 2009.  Minister of Health Qamar Aden Ali, Minister of Education Ahmed Abdulahi Waayeel and Minister of Higher Education Ibrahim Hassan Addow were killed in the blast.  At the time, Roble was serving as Minister of Sport. Roble died on February 12, 2010, at a hospital in the Saudi capital Riyadh, after he and other victims of the blast had been flown there for treatment.

References

Year of birth missing
2010 deaths
2009 murders in Somalia
2010 murders in Somalia
Deaths by suicide bomber
Terrorism deaths in Somalia
Government ministers of Somalia
People murdered in Somalia
Terrorist incidents in Somalia in 2009